Clarence George Jeffreys (or Jeffries; 6 August 1932 – 27 August 2020) was an Australian rugby league footballer who played in the 1950s and 1960s, and coached in the 1970s.

Playing career
Jeffreys started his playing career at Balmain in 1953. He played three seasons at the Tigers before moving to Newtown in 1958. He played over 200 grade games with Newtown including 84 in first grade, mainly playing hooker. He retired in 1968, and returned to the club as a lower grade coach.

Coaching career
Jeffreys took over the role of first grade coach in 1974 after Jack Gibson resigned. Jeffreys coached the club for three years, during a tough period in the club's history.

References

1932 births
2020 deaths
Australian rugby league coaches
Australian rugby league players
Balmain Tigers players
Newtown Jets coaches
Newtown Jets players
Place of birth missing
Rugby league hookers
Rugby league second-rows